Flaminio Innocenzo Minozzi (3 October 1735 - 1817) was an Italian painter, mainly of quadratura. He was a pupil of his father Bernardo Minozzi, a landscape painter in Bologna. He won the Marsili-Aldrovandi Award (Premio Marsili-Aldrovandi) at the Accademia Clementina and worked with Carlo Galli Bibiena. He later moved to work in Lisbon.

His works are held in many museums worldwide, including the Metropolitan Museum of Art, the Minneapolis Institute of Art, the Museum of Fine Arts, Boston, the Princeton University Art Museum, and the University of Michigan Museum of Art.

References

1735 births
1817 deaths
18th-century Italian painters
Italian male painters
19th-century Italian painters
Quadratura painters
Painters from Bologna
Italian landscape painters
19th-century Italian male artists
18th-century Italian male artists